The siege of Malacca of 1606 was a military engagement between a Dutch force commanded by Cornelis Matelief and the Portuguese commander André Furtado de Mendonça.

The small Portuguese garrison managed to hold out and stop any Dutch direct attacks on the city until additional reinforcements could arrive led by Martim Afonso de Castro, which made the Dutch retreat from the siege. After they retreated, they were again defeated by the Portuguese at the Battle of Cape Rachado.

References

Malacca (1606)
Malacca (1606)
Malacca
1606 in Asia
Malacca
1606 in the Portuguese Empire
1606 in the Dutch Empire